20 Anos Depois – Ar de Rock (literally Air of Rock, meaning "a rock look"; a pun on hard rock: 20 Years Later) is a compilation album released by Portuguese rock singer Rui Veloso. The album was released in 2000.

The disc was recorded in commemoration of the 20th anniversary of his first album Ar de Rock released in 1980.

The album features mostly Portuguese artists including Xutos & Pontapés, Clã, Ala dos Namorados and some more, which recorded the original songs with the first mock-up themes.  Other artists included the Portuguese-born Nuno Bettencourt and Brazilian singers including Os Paralamas do Sucesso and Barão Vermelho.  The last three are not included in the previous album.

Track listing

References

External links
20 anos depois - Ar de Rock at Rate Your Music

2000 compilation albums
Rui Veloso albums